Aneurinibacillus soli is a Gram-positive, aerobic, rod-shaped and motile bacterium from the genus of Aneurinibacillus which has been isolated from soil from the mountain Hallasan.

References

Paenibacillaceae
Bacteria described in 2014